Neotenogyniidae is a family of mites in the order Mesostigmata.

Species
Neotenogyniidae contains two genera, with two recognized species:

 Genus Neotenogynium Kethley, 1974
 Neotenogynium malkini Kethley, 1974
 Genus Sternoseius Balough, 1963
 Sternoseius argentinensis Balough, 1963

References

Mesostigmata
Acari families